|}

The Galmoy Hurdle is a Grade 2 National Hunt hurdle race in Ireland. It is run at Gowran Park in January, over a distance of about 3 miles (4,828 metres) and during the race there are 13 flights of hurdles to be jumped. The race was first run in 2002 and was contested at Grade 3 level between 2003 and 2008.  

The race is named in honour of the John Mulhern trained Galmoy, who won the Stayers' Hurdle in 1987 and 1988.

Records
Most successful horse (2 wins):
 Emotional Moment – 2005, 2006
 Presenting Percy - 2018, 2019

Leading jockey (5 wins):
 Davy Russell – 	Alpha Ridge (2009), Bog Warrior (2013), Presenting Percy (2018, 2019), Teahupoo (2023)

Leading trainer  (4 wins):
 Willie Mullins -  	Mourad (2011), Zaidpour (2012), Shaneshill (2017), Benie Des Dieux (2020)

Winners

See also
 Horse racing in Ireland
 List of Irish National Hunt races

References
Racing Post:
, 

National Hunt races in Ireland
National Hunt hurdle races
Gowran Park Racecourse
Recurring sporting events established in 2002
2002 establishments in Ireland